Yasin Ali Egal (born 1 March 1991) is a former Somali footballer who played as a defender.

Club career
Yasin began his career with Elman in 2003, signing for Banadir Telecom in 2006, before finishing his career with the club.

International career
On 16 November 2003, Yasin made his debut for Somalia in a 5–0 loss against Ghana in a  FIFA World Cup qualification game. Yasin later captained Somalia.

References

Somalian footballers
Elman FC players
Living people
1991 births
Association football defenders
Somalia international footballers